Kyaa Kool Hain Hum 3 is a 2016 Indian Hindi-language sex comedy film starring Tusshar Kapoor, Aftab Shivdasani and Mandana Karimi in lead roles along with Gizele Thakral, Claudia Ciesla, Krishna Abhishek, Shakti Kapoor, Darshan Jariwala in pivotal roles. It was released on January 22, 2016. The film is a sequel to 2005's Kyaa Kool Hai Hum and 2012's Kyaa Super Kool Hain Hum, and is the third installment of the Kyaa Kool Hain Hum film series.

Plot 

Kanhaiya is a soft and innocent man who wants to find his true love and while his best friend Rocky, is far from innocence unlike his friend, and sleeps with a lot of girls. Kanhaiya walks into his job and is greeted by a woman wearing red and loses his focus because of some defect and quickly walks away. The woman unknowingly drinks a coffee mixed with a powder which makes people horny and walks into his office in an urge to have sex. He retaliates and amidst their scuffle, she lands on a photocopier and later during the meeting, close pictures of her body get shown and Kanhaiya's father, Mr PK Lele gets very furious at him and fires him. Rocky calms him down and tells him that he can impress his father during his grandmother's 69th birthday. There Rocky brings a very inappropriate cake, infuriating PK and Kanhaiya's step-mother. Kanhaiya asks him to buy a gift for his grandmother. After shopping online, he starts watching porn and masturbating while Kanhaiya and his grandmother walk in and she dies of a heart attack, resulting in Kanhaiya getting kicked out of his house.

The two get a call from their childhood friend, Mickey, who lives in Thailand, inviting them both to take part in his business. Upon reaching there, they realize that Mickey has a business of making porn parodies of popular Indian movies. Kanhaiya refuses to work in an inappropriate job but agrees after a lot of convincing. Along with Mickey's other actor friends, Merili, Shakuntala and others, they start making porn parody films.

One day at a mall, Kanhaiya finds a girl, Shalu, immediately falling in love with her but she mistakes him to be a pervert and leaves in disgust. Later, on a beach she finds him and they talk and he clears all the misunderstandings. The two start dating while Shalu has no idea about Kanhaiya's job and he proposes her saying that he is very rich. In response, Shalu reveals that she and her father, who prefers traditions, would like to meet his family before their wedding. Unable to get any other solution, Kanhaiya decides to arrange a fake family out of his actor friends. Shalu and her father, Mr Karjatiya arrive and are greeted by the fake family and Kanhaiya manages to convince them. Mickey arrives, posing as Kanhaiya's father while unknowingly Rocky also poses as his father. They manage to lie and convince that Rocky is his biological father and Mickey just took care of him. Karjatiya's mute wife, Sindoor also arrives who has a dog, Sakru, and her nephew, Jimmy, who translates whatever she says. Suddenly, Kanhaiya's actual father arrives with his stepmother after being called by Rocky and the three lie that Kanhaiya's stepmother is his actual mother who left Rocky for another man.
The actors mess things up sometimes because of their horny sexual instincts. Amidst the chaos, they realise that they can't shoot more films now but they decide to do it all secretly and almost get caught when Sindoor and Jimmy walk in during their shoot. Later, while everyone is having dinner, the actors start getting frisky under the table while Sindoor gets attracted to Mickey and Kanhaiya's stepmother to Rocky. Karjatiya mixes a powder in Rocky and the stepmother's dessert to rekindle their love, believing their lie, which makes Kanhaiya's stepmother horny and in the middle of night she sneaks into Rocky's room while he was sleeping with Merili to have sex. The actors also sneak inside each other's rooms to have sex and Kanhaiya finds Shalu also seducing him for sex. They all barely manage to not get caught by Karjatiya.

Rocky and Kanhaiya realise that this has been all Karjatiya's doing and Rocky devises another plan. He lies to Karjatiya that he has a girlfriend, Vidya and doesn't love his first wife anymore but to make matters worse, Karjatiya demands that he wants to meets Vidya later when the family goes for a beach picnic. There, Kanhaiya dresses as a woman and poses as Vidya to convince Karjatiya who gets attracted to him along with Kanhaiya's father. When they question Kanhaiya's disappearance, Vidya lies that he is in the mall resulting in everyone going to the mall looking for him. Kanhaiya and Rocky are terrified to find DVDs of their films in the same store in the mall as the family and quickly decide to buy all of it to hide them but the shop owner delays them and in a scuffle, the DVDs get scattered around and everyone learns about the duo's dirty business and Karjatiya calls off the wedding. Upon hearing this, Vidya (Kanhaiya) decides to kill himself and runs to the beach where he, Rocky, PK, Karjatiya and Sindoor get stuck in a quicksand and they figure out that Vidya is Kanhaiya. Mickey and Shalu arrive in a hot air balloon to their rescue after being informed by Karjatiya's parrot and they successfully save everyone.
After everyone accepts their mistakes, Karjatiya forgives Kanhaiya and allows him to marry Shalu while Mickey decides to direct family movies only.

Cast
 Tusshar Kapoor as Kanhaiya
 Aftab Shivdasani as Rocky
 Mandana Karimi  as Shaalu Karjatiya
Priya Raina as the voice of Shaalu Karjatiya
 Krishna Abhishek as Mickey
 Claudia Ciesla as Sakku/Shakuntala
 Gizele Thakral as Sanskaar/Meri Lee
 Darshan Jariwala as Surya Karjatiya
 Meghna Naidu as Maasi
 Shakti Kapoor as PK Lele
 Sushmita Mukherjee as Sindoor Bua
 Ritesh Deshmukh as Satya Naash
 VJ Andy
 Danny Sura as Sundar
 Jimmy Moses as Jimmy
 Dinky Kapoor as the sexy secretary in the office of Kanhaiya
 Gauahar Khan in a special appearance in the song "Jawaani Le Doobi"
 Razzak Khan in a cameo as Popat Laundrywala

Soundtrack

Critical reception 

Like it's older installments, this film also received negative reviews from critics due to its adult content.

References

External links
 
 
 Official website of Balaji Telefilms

2010s buddy comedy films
2010s Hindi-language films
2010s sex comedy films
Balaji Motion Pictures films
Films about pornography
Films set in Thailand
Indian buddy comedy films
Indian sequel films
Indian sex comedy films
2016 comedy films